João Paulo de Lima Filho (born 15 June 1957), better known as João Paulo, is a Brazilian footballer. He played in four matches for the Brazil national football team in 1983. He was also part of Brazil's squad for the 1979 Copa América tournament.

References

External links
 

1957 births
Living people
Brazilian footballers
Brazil international footballers
Place of birth missing (living people)
Association footballers not categorized by position